Anthurium bushii is a species of plant in the arum family, Araceae. It is endemic to Ecuador. It is known only from the type locality in Morona-Santiago Province. It is an epiphyte which grows in the forests of the lower Andes.

References

bushii
Endangered plants
Endemic flora of Ecuador
Taxonomy articles created by Polbot